Khalid Al-Rowaihi (15 December 1972 - 14 March 1993) was a Saudi Arabian footballer who played for Al-Watani club and Al-Ahli club.

He was born in Tabuk on 15 December 1972. His father was from Saudi Arabia and his mother from Egypt.

Career
He played in the 1989 FIFA World Youth Championship with the Saudi national under-16 team and got on the top goalscorers list in the World cup, in the Asian under-15 cup and in Thailand in 1988.

He scored with the Saudi team 14 goals, and with Al-Ahli club 19 goals.

International goals

Death
He died in a road accident in Jordan on 14 March 1993, aged 20 years.

Honors

National Team
FIFA U-17 World Cup : 1989
AFC U-17 Championship : 1988

People from Tabuk, Saudi Arabia
Saudi Arabian people of Egyptian descent
Saudi Arabian footballers
Road incident deaths in Jordan
1993 deaths
1972 births
Al-Ahli Saudi FC players
Al-Watani Club players
Saudi First Division League players
Saudi Professional League players
Association football forwards